Fairmont is a city in and the county seat of Martin County, Minnesota, United States. The population was 10,487 at the 2020 census.

History
Fairmont was platted in 1857. The city was so named on account of its elevated town site. A post office has been in operation at Fairmont since 1858. Fairmont was incorporated as a city in 1902.

Geography
The city of Fairmont itself has been built around a chain of five lakes: Lake George, Sisseton Lake, Budd Lake, Hall Lake, and Amber Lake. All except Amber Lake are connected by channels and are used extensively for recreational boating and fishing.
Interstate 90 and Minnesota State Highway 15 are two of the main routes in the city.

Climate

Demographics

2010 census
As of the census of 2010, there were 10,666 people, 4,812 households, and 2,816 families living in the city. The racial makeup of the city was 95.6% White, 0.5% African American, 0.3% Native American, 0.7% Asian, 1.9% from other races, and 1.1% from two or more races. Hispanic or Latino of any race were 5.3% of the population.

There were 4,812 households, of which 24.8% had children under the age of 18 living with them, 45.2% were married couples living together, 9.4% had a female householder with no husband present, 4.0% had a male householder with no wife present, and 41.5% were non-families. 36.0% of all households were made up of individuals, and 16.9% had someone living alone who was 65 years of age or older. The average household size was 2.17 and the average family size was 2.78.

The median age in the city was 45.5 years. 21.4% of residents were under the age of 18; 6.9% were between the ages of 18 and 24; 21.1% were from 25 to 44; 28.4% were from 45 to 64; and 22.2% were 65 years of age or older. The gender makeup of the city was 47.5% male and 52.5% female.

2000 census
As of the census of 2000, there were 10,889 people and 2,962 families living in the city. The racial makeup of the city was 96.1% White, 0.4% African American, 0.1% Native American, 0.6% Asian, 0.03% Pacific Islander, 1.9% from other races, and 0.9% from two or more races.

There were 4,702 households, out of which 28.6% had children under the age of 18 living with them, 51.0% were married couples living together, 9.3% had a female householder with no husband present, and 37.0% were non-families. 33.2% of all households were made up of individuals, and 16.7% had someone living alone who was 65 years of age or older.  The average household size was 2.25 and the average family size was 2.86.

In the city, the age of the population is varied with 24.3% under the age of 18, 6.7% from 18 to 24, 24.8% from 25 to 44, 23.1% from 45 to 64, and 21.1% who were 65 years of age or older.  The median age was 41 years. For every 100 females, there were 90.2 males.  For every 100 females age 18 and over, there were 85.3 males.

The median income for a household in the city was $33,709, and the median income for a family was $46,637. Males had a median income of $31,365 versus $22,447 for females.  The per capita income for the city was $18,658.  About 8.0% of families and 11.9% of the population were below the poverty line, including 20.7% of those under age 18 and 9.3% of those age 65 or over.

Economy
Fairmont has been home to Fairmont Railway Motors, Inc, now part of Harsco Corporation, for a century.  The company pioneered motorized railway section cars, later road-rail technologies as well as track maintenance machinery that revolutionized and mechanized rail track engineering. Its 100th anniversary celebration was held in the summer of 2009.

Fairmont products are exported around the world, although the dominant product, railroad speeders, is now mainly in the hands of railway enthusiasts who operate them for fun, such as the North American Railcar Operators Association and the Australian Society of Section Car Operators, Inc.

Fairmont is home to the U.S. headquarters of Avery Weigh-Tronix, one of the world's largest suppliers of weighing solutions.

The Fairmont Sentinel, cited as the most conservative newspaper in Minnesota, is published here.  It was founded in 1885 and is published daily, except Sunday.  As of 2019, it was owned by Ogden Newspapers and had a circulation of 3,629.

The largest employer in Fairmont is Fairmont Medical Center, part of the Mayo Health System.

Prior to 1992, Fairmont had been home to a major regional frozen food canning operation. Longtime owned by the Stokely-Van Camp company, the plant fell under the United Foods International umbrella after United Foods' 1982 $50 million buy-out of Van Camp's frozen vegetable division.  Before closing in December 1992, the Fairmont plant was one three frozen vegetable processing plants producing product for the United Foods family of canned vegetables for sale throughout the United States. The plant reopened and operated until 2015 as Fairmont Foods of Minnesota. Its closing was announced, but instead Tony Downs Food Group purchased it and kept it open.

Top employers
According to the Fairmont's 2020 Comprehensive Annual Financial Report, the largest employers in the city are:

Education
Local area schools

Fairmont Junior/Senior High School
Fairmont Elementary School
St. John Vianney Catholic School, K-6
St Paul Lutheran School, K-8 (Martin Luther High School 9-12 is in nearby Northrop)

Higher education
Minnesota West Community College
Presentation College-Fairmont Campus

Notable people
 Frank A. Day, Newspaper editor, Minnesota legislator and the 13th Lieutenant Governor of Minnesota
 Kelly D. Holstine, Education Minnesota's 2018 Minnesota Teacher of the Year
 Jay Maynard, the internet celebrity known as "Tron-Guy".
 Paul Willson, actor best known for his role as Paul in Cheers and Bob Porter in Office Space

References

External links

Fairmont Information
Fairmont Sentinel
Fairmont Area Schools
Fairmont Opera House
Martin County Historical Society
KFMC radio

Cities in Minnesota
Cities in Martin County, Minnesota
County seats in Minnesota